Aronstein is a surname. Notable people with the surname include:

Barbara Aronstein Black (born 1933), American legal scholar
Martin Aronstein (1936–2002), American lighting designer 
Victor Aronstein (1896–1945), German-Jewish doctor murdered in Auschwitz

See also
Arnstein (personal name)